Union Township is one of thirteen townships in St. Joseph County, in the U.S. state of Indiana. As of the 2000 census, its population was 3,289.

Geography

Cities, towns, villages
 Lakeville

Unincorporated towns
 Colburn at 
 Midway Corners at 
(This list is based on USGS data and may include former settlements.)

Adjacent townships
 Centre Township (north)
 Madison Township (east)
 German Township, Marshall County (southeast)
 North Township, Marshall County (south)
 Liberty Township (west)
 Greene Township (northwest)

Cemeteries
The township contains Lakeville Cemetery.

Major highways

Lakes
 Fites Lake
 Pleasant Lake
 Riddles Lake

School districts
 Union-North United School Corporation

Political districts
 Indiana's 2nd congressional district
 State House District 21
 State Senate District 9

References

Sources
 United States Census Bureau 2008 TIGER/Line Shapefiles
 United States Board on Geographic Names (GNIS)
 IndianaMap

External links
 Indiana Township Association
 United Township Association of Indiana

Townships in St. Joseph County, Indiana
South Bend – Mishawaka metropolitan area
Townships in Indiana